Tachi Palace Fights 9 was a mixed martial arts event held by Tachi Palace Fights (TPF) on Friday, May 6 at the Tachi Palace Hotel and Casino in Lemoore, California.

Background
Alexis Vila was due to take on John Dodson, but pulled out of the bout with an unknown injury. Dodson was to fight Shooto veteran Mamoru Yamaguchi. However, on April 18, Dodson pulled out of the bout due to undisclosed reasons and Yamaguchi instead fought John Dunsmoor.

Phil Collins was expected to face Waachiim Spiritwolf at this event, but pulled out on February 9 due to personal reasons. Spiritwolf instead faced Jorge Lopez.

Jamie Yager was set to fight Alan Jouban, but pulled out of the fight due to injury. Stepping in to fill the void was Chidi Njokuani.

On April 25 it was announced that Cole Escovedo was tapped by the UFC to fight against Renan Barão at UFC 130, leaving Tommy Vargas without an opponent. Farkhad Sharipov stepped in to fight Vargas.

Featherweight champion Isaac DeJesus failed to make weight for his title defense against Russ Miura and was stripped of his belt. Both fighters agreed to a catchweight bout.

Results

Main Card
Flyweight bout:  Ian McCall vs.  Dustin Ortiz
McCall defeated Ortiz via unanimous decision (30-27, 30-27, 30-27)
Featherweight (non title) bout:  Isaac DeJesus vs.  Russ Miura
Originally, DeJesus defeated Miura via TKO (punches) at 2:52 of round 1; this bout was later ruled a no contest after DeJesus tested positive for marijuana.
Lightweight bout:  Efrain Escudero vs.  Fabricio Camoes
Camoes defeated Escudero via unanimous decision (29-28, 29-28, 29-28)
Middleweight bout:   Anthony Ruiz vs. Gerald Harris
Harris defeated Ruiz via unanimous decision (30-27, 29-28, 29-28)
Flyweight bout:  Kevin Dunsmoor vs.  Mamoru Yamaguchi
Yamaguchi defeated Dunsmoor via KO (punch) at 4:03 of round 2.
Middleweight bout:  Jorge Lopez vs.  Waachiim Spiritwolf
Lopez defeated Spiritwolf via unanimous decision (30-27, 30-27, 30-27)
Bantamweight bout:  Farkhad Sharipov vs.  Tommy Vargas
Sharipov defeated Vargas via unanimous decision (30-27, 30-27, 29-28)
Welterweight bout:  Alan Jouban vs.  Chidi Njokuani
Njokuani defeated Jouban via KO (body kick) at 1:27 of round 3.
Lightweight bout:  Art Arciniega vs.  Josh Herrick
Arciniega defeated Herrick via submission (triangle choke) at 1:08 of round 1.
Bantamweight bout:  Cody Gibson vs.  Walel Watson
Gibson defeated Watson via TKO (punches) at 4:09 of round 2.
Featherweight bout:  Jesse Bowen vs.  Brad McDonald
McDonald defeated Bowen via split decision (29-28, 28-29, 29-28)
Welterweight bout:  Kenny Ento vs.  James Chaney
Ento defeated Chaney via TKO (cut) at 1:53 of round 2.
Lightweight bout:  Alex Perez vs.  Jesus Castro
Perez defeated Castro via TKO (punches) at 1:56 of round 1.

References

Tachi Palace Fights events
2011 in mixed martial arts
Mixed martial arts in California
Sports in Lemoore, California
2011 in sports in California